Wynnum railway station is located on the Cleveland line in Queensland, Australia. It is one of three stations serving the Brisbane suburb of Wynnum, the other two being Wynnum North and Wynnum Central.

Services
Wynnum is served by Cleveland line services from Shorncliffe, Northgate, Doomben and Bowen Hills to Manly & Cleveland.

Services by platform

References

External links

Wynnum station Queensland's Railways on the Internet
[ Wynnum station] TransLink travel information

Railway stations in Brisbane
Wynnum, Queensland